Davide Kovač (born 19 November 1999) is a Serbian volleyball player, a member of the Bulgarian club Dobrudja 07 Dobrich.

His father is Slobodan Kovač, a former volleyball player and coach for several years.

References

External links
 LegaVolley profile
 Volleybox profile
 WorldofVolley profile
 BVF-Web.DataProject profile

1999 births
Living people
Sportspeople from Taranto
Serbian men's volleyball players
Expatriate volleyball players in Italy
Serbian expatriate sportspeople in Bulgaria
Serbian expatriate sportspeople in Italy
21st-century Serbian people